Thiago Oliveira dos Santos (born 26 May 1981 in Brazil) is a Brazilian retired footballer.

Career

After playing for São Paulo, Oliveira signed for Al Ahli in Qatar, where he played with Pep Guardiola, who he discussed tactics with. In 2008, he returned to Al Ahli because his family adapted to Qatar well.

References

External links
 Thiago Oliveira at Soccerway

Brazilian footballers
Living people
Association football forwards
1981 births
Kalmar FF players